IM Normae is a recurrent nova in the constellation Norma, one of only ten known in the Milky Way. It has been observed to erupt in 1920 and 2002, reaching magnitude 8.5 from a baseline of 18.3. It was poorly monitored after the first eruption, so it is possible  that it erupted in between these dates.

At minimum, IM Normae shows brightness variations of about 0.3 magnitudes.  These consist of 0.2 magnitude dips that are interpreted as partial eclipses of the accretion disk, and continuous variations caused by one side of the secondary star being heated by the white dwarf and therefore brighter than the other face.  The orbital period is 2.462 hours.

References

Recurrent novae
Norma (constellation)
Normae, IM